Alice Jeanette Williams (June 11, 1914 – October 24, 2008), née Alice Jeanette Klemptner, was an American politician and human and women's rights activist from Seattle, Washington. She served on the Seattle City Council from 1969 to 1989. In 1962, she became the first woman to head the King County Democrats as well as any major political party in a large metropolitan area in the United States.

Early years 
Born in Seattle, Washington to Russian immigrants, Dr. Louis and Olga Klemptner, she attended Mercer Grade School and Queen Anne High School. Originally named after woman suffragist Alice Paul, she went by her middle name Jeanette beginning in her youth. At the age of 16, she attended Cornish School and later received graduate degrees in Violin at the University of Washington and American Conservatory of Music. While in Chicago, she played with the Chicago Philharmonic Orchestra and formed a string quartet composed of women who toured the country playing jazz and blues music. She married David Williams whom she had met while travelling to Los Angeles with the group.

Political career 
Williams began her political career while serving as a precinct committee officer. In 1962, she became the first woman to chair the King County Democrats as well as any other major political party in a large metropolitan area in the country.

In 1969, she won a seat on the Seattle City Council where she would serve for twenty years after five consecutive re-elections. Williams introduced some of the first legislation to prohibit employment and housing discrimination against gays and lesbians in the city. She pushed for additional laws giving the same protections to transgender people. Councilman Tom Rasmussen noted that Williams "fought for women's rights and the rights of gay and lesbian people long before it was acceptable, when it was a very courageous and risky thing to do."

In 1972, Williams formed the Seattle Women's Commission to advise the mayor, city council, and city departments on issues that impact women in Seattle. During her tenure, she lobbied the federal government for funding for the construction of the West Seattle Bridge and led and supported many efforts related to Seattle parks. She introduced legislation to convert Kubota Garden to a city park and promoted the preservation of the Sand Point Naval Air Station as Magnuson Park.

Legacy 
In 2009, the West Seattle Bridge was named in Williams' honor. In 2003, the Jeanette Williams Award was created as part of the 2003 Seattle Women’s Summit to recognize an individual who demonstrates significant leadership and service in advancing the cause of women in Seattle. The award is granted on an annual basis and as of 2014 has expanded to include awards for an individual, organization, and business.

References

Further reading 
 Southwest Seattle Historical Society, Log House Museum, West Seattle (Arcadia Publishing, 2010)

External links

 Biography at HistoryLink.org
 Seattle Women's Commission

1914 births
2008 deaths
Seattle City Council members
University of Washington alumni
American feminists
American human rights activists
Women human rights activists
Cornish College of the Arts alumni
American Conservatory of Music alumni
American people of Russian descent
20th-century American politicians
Women city councillors in Washington (state)
20th-century American women politicians
Activists from Seattle
21st-century American women